James Stewart (1908–1997) was an American actor and USAF brigadier general.

James Stewart may also refer to:

Law
 James B. Stewart (born c. 1952), American lawyer, journalist, and author
 James Kirkpatrick Stewart, Canadian lawyer
 James McGregor Stewart (1889–1955), Canadian lawyer, president of the Canadian Bar Association
 James Stewart (solicitor) (born 1966), Northern Irish lawyer

Military
 James Stewart (British Army general) (c. 1699–1768), British lieutenant-general, Member of UK Parliament for Wigtown Burghs
 James Stewart (artilleryman) (1826–1905), American Union military officer
 James A. Stewart (Medal of Honor) (1839–?), United States Marine and Medal of Honor recipient
 James Stewart (Australian Army officer) (1884–1947), Australian Army officer
 James N. Stewart, United States Air Force major general and Trump administration official
 James P. Stewart (born 1924), United States Coast Guard admiral
 James T. Stewart (1921–1990), United States Air Force general

Monarchs of the House of Stewart
James I of Scotland (1394–1437)
James II of Scotland (1430–1460)
James III of Scotland (1451–1488)
James IV of Scotland (1473–1513)
James V of Scotland (1512–1542)
James VI of Scotland and I of England
James VII of Scotland and II of England
James Francis Edward Stuart (Jacobite pretender, 1688–1766)

Noblemen
James Stewart, 5th High Steward of Scotland (1260–1309)
James Stewart, the Black Knight of Lorn (–after 1451)
James Mor Stewart (c. 1400–1429 or 1449)
James "Beag" Stewart (died 1470), son of James Mor Stewart
James Stewart, 1st Earl of Buchan (1442–1499)
James Stewart, Duke of Ross (1476–1504)
James Stewart, 1st Earl of Moray (1501 creation) (c. 1501–1544)
James Stewart, 1st Earl of Moray (–1570)
James Stewart, 2nd Earl of Moray (died 1592), Scottish nobleman
James Stewart, Earl of Arran (died 1596)
James Stewart, 1st Duke of Richmond (1612–1655), British nobleman
James Stewart, 4th Lord Ochiltree (died 1658), Scottish noble

Politics

Great Britain and Ireland 
Sir James Stewart (advocate, born 1635) (1635–1713), Scottish lawyer and politician, Lord Advocate 1692–1709 and 1711–13
Sir James Stewart, 1st Baronet (1681–1727), Scottish lawyer and politician, Solicitor General for Scotland 1709–14 and 1714–17, son of the above
Sir James Stewart, 7th Baronet (died 1827), Irish politician
James Stewart (Honiton MP) (1805–1860), English politician
James Stewart (Greenock MP) (1827–1895), Scottish Liberal politician
James Stewart (Glasgow MP) (1863–1931), Scottish Labour Party politician, MP for Glasgow St. Rollox, 1922–1931
Sir James Henderson-Stewart (1897–1961), British banker, Army officer and politician
James Stewart (Irish politician) (1934–2013), Irish communist activist
James Stewart (Northern Ireland politician), Unionist politician from Northern Ireland

United States
 James Stewart (North Carolina politician) (1775–1821), United States Congressman from North Carolina
 James Augustus Stewart (1808–1879), U.S. Congressman from Maryland
 James E. Stewart (politician) (1814–1890), American politician and judge in Virginia
 James F. Stewart (1851–1904), United States Representative from New Jersey
 James H. Stewart (1859–1924), teacher and Republican politician in Texas
 James Garfield Stewart (1880–1959), Republican from Cincinnati, Ohio

Elsewhere
 James Stewart (Nova Scotia politician) (1765–1830), lawyer, judge and politician in Nova Scotia
 James Stewart (Queensland politician) (1851–1931), Australian Senator from Queensland
 James Stewart (South Australian politician) (1842–1871), pastoralist and politician in the colony of South Australia
 James David Stewart (1874–1933), Prince Edward Island premier
 James Stewart II (Jamaica), Jamaican slave owner and politician

Religion
 James Stewart (bishop) (died 1466), Roman Catholic Bishop of Moray, Scotland
 James Haldane Stewart (1778–1854), American priest in England
 James Stewart (missionary) (1831–1905), missionary and physician in South Africa and Moderator of the General Assembly of the Free Church of Scotland
 James Stewart (minister, born 1896) (1896–1990), Moderator of the General Assembly of the Church of Scotland and Chaplain to the Queen

Sports

Football and rugby
 James Stewart (footballer, born 1883) (1883–1957), English international footballer (Sheffield Wednesday, Newcastle United and Rangers)
 James Stewart (footballer, born 1885) (1885–?), Scottish footballer (Motherwell, Liverpool)
 James Stewart (rugby union) (1890–1973), New Zealand rugby union player
 James Stewart (American football, born December 27, 1971) (born 1971), for the Jacksonville Jaguars and the Detroit Lions
 James Stewart (American football, born December 8, 1971) (born 1971), for the Minnesota Vikings
 James Stewart (Australian footballer) (born 1994), Australian rules footballer for Essendon

Other sports
 James Stewart (Australian cricketer), Australian cricketer
 James Stewart (English cricketer) (1861–1943), English cricketer
 James Stewart (basketball) (1910–1990), Canadian basketball player
 James Stewart (decathlete) (1906–1991), American decathlete
 James Stewart (rower) (born 1973), Australian rower
 James Benjamin Stewart (born 1978), Canadian karateka and kickboxer
 James Stewart Jr. (born 1985), professional motocross racer

Others
 James Hope Stewart (1789–1883), Scottish natural history artist
 James Stewart (engraver) (1791–1863), Scottish engraver
 James Stewart of the Glen (died 1752), Scotsman accused of accessory to the murder of Cailean Ruadh Caimbeul
 James G. Stewart (1907–1997), American audio engineer
 James Stewart (archaeologist) (1913–1962), Australian archaeologist
 James Wallace Stewart (1921–2006), English professor of haematology
 James Stewart (mathematician) (1941–2014), Canadian professor of mathematics at McMaster University
 James B. Stewart (economist) (born 1947), emeritus professor of Economics and African-American Studies
 James Stewart (Australian actor) (born 1975), in television series Breakers and Monarch Cove
 James R. Stewart, American president of the Universal Negro Improvement Association
 James E. Stewart (civil rights leader)
 Stewart Granger (James Lablanche Stewart, 1913–1993), English actor

See also
James Steuart (disambiguation)
James Stewart-Mackenzie (disambiguation)
James Stuart (disambiguation)
Jamie Stewart (disambiguation)
Jim Stewart (disambiguation)
Jimmy Stewart (disambiguation)